Egypt was a battle honour  awarded to units of the British and Indian armies that took part in the British expedition to Egypt under the command of General Sir Ralph Abercromby (and later General John Hely-Hutchinson) between 8 March and 26 August 1801, towards the end of the French campaign in Egypt and Syria. It was awarded to British units with the badge of the Sphinx and initially to Indian units simply as Egypt. Later, the badge of the Sphinx was taken into use by Indian units also.

Engagements during the expedition included:

 Battle of Aboukir
 Battle of Mandora (also awarded in its own right)
 Battle of Alexandria 
 Siege of Fort Julien
 Siege of Cairo
 Siege of Alexandria (Marabout was awarded to the 54th Foot, later the 2nd Battalion, the Dorsetshire Regiment)

References

Bibliography

 Rodger, Alexander (2003). Battle Honours of the British Empire and Commonwealth Land Forces. Marlborough: The Crowood Press.

Battle honours of the British Army
19th-century military history of the United Kingdom